This is a list of Members of Parliament elected in the 1929 Northern Ireland general election. Elections to the 3rd Northern Ireland House of Commons were held on 22 May 1929.

All members of the Northern Ireland House of Commons elected at the 1929 Northern Ireland general election are listed.

Sir James Craig, (created Viscount Craigavon following the election) continued as Prime Minister.

Members

Changes
10 November 1930: James Fulton Gamble elected for the Unionists in North Tyrone, following the death of William Thomas Miller.
31 January 1933: Death of James Lenox-Conyngham Chichester-Clark.  This vacancy remained unfilled at the time of the next general election.

References
Biographies of Members of the Northern Ireland House of Commons

1929